Link Road  is a road in Cuttack, Odisha, India. It runs east from Link road cross at one end to Badambadi circle at the other.

Link Road is also one of the busiest roads in the city and is lined on one side with retail stores, banks, many public buildings including BSNL customer care office, Madhupatna police station and restaurants. It has many office buildings, shops and theaters. It is also a home to a large number of buildings, Schools & banks. Such as Nishamani cinema Hall, Max showroom, Agrawal eye hospital, Samrat cinema hall,    [Matrubhaban school & college school & college etc.

Location
From badambadi it is around 2 km away.

It can be easily found from Google Maps

It is situated in India, odisha, cuttack

References

External links

Transport in Cuttack
Shopping districts and streets in India
Articles containing video clips